Ernest Walter Hampton (born 1885) was a British co-operative activist.

Born in Bristol, Hampton attended Ruskin College in Oxford, receiving a Diploma of Economics and Political Science accredited by the University of Oxford.  He became involved in the co-operative movement, and served as the chairman of Co-operative Builders, based in Birmingham.  While there, he became politically active with the Co-operative Party.

In 1919, Hampton was one of the first three Co-operative Party candidates elected to Birmingham City Council, winning the Balsall Heath ward, holding the seat for three years.  The Co-operative Party soon allied with the Labour Party, and in 1921/22, Hampton was secretary of the Birmingham Labour Party group.  He stood as a joint Labour Co-operative candidate in Birmingham Sparkbrook at the 1922 United Kingdom general election, taking third place with 23.4% of the vote.  In the 1923 United Kingdom general election, he stood again, but this time as a Labour Party candidate, sponsored by the National Union of Clerks.  He improved his vote share slightly, to 24.6%, and moved up to second place.

In 1928, Hampton wrote a history of co-operation in Birmingham.  He became the area organiser for the co-operative movement, but he moved away from the district in 1930.

References

1885 births
Year of death missing
Co-operative Party politicians
Councillors in Birmingham, West Midlands
Labour Party (UK) parliamentary candidates
Politicians from Bristol